Daniel Reese (31 October 1841 – 4 October 1891) was a 19th-century Member of Parliament from Christchurch, New Zealand.

Reese was born in Motherwell, Scotland, on 31 October 1841. He emigrated to New Zealand in 1862 on the New Zealandia. His wife to be, Cecilia, was also from Lanarkshire in Scotland and arrived in New Zealand in 1863. They married in 1867. Reese founded a building firm in 1864. He was a champion rower, and his son Dan Reese (who was 12 when Reese Sr. died) was a champion Canterbury cricketer. Two other sons, Tom and Jack, were also prominent cricketers in Canterbury. His youngest son, Andrew Reese, was an architect; he was killed in action in 1917.

Reese had several high-profile commissions. He built Trinity Congregational Church (ca 1870), the Canterbury Club (1873), Cranmer Court (1873–1875), St Paul's Church (1877), parts of Lincoln College, the Chief Post Office (1877–1878), the United Service Hotel in Cathedral Square (1884–1885), parts of Sunnyside Hospital, the first Christchurch Girls' High School (now part of the Arts Centre), and the second Girls' High School (1881). He also built the Belfast Freezing Works.

 

Reese was elected onto Christchurch City Council for the South-west ward in 1882 and served until 1885. He was re-elected for the period from 1888 to 1891. He represented the Stanmore electorate from 1884 when he defeated Walter Pilliet, but was defeated in 1887 by Andrew Loughrey when he stood in Linwood.

Reese had Bright's disease and was ill for four months before he died at his home in Sumner on 4 October 1891. He had moved to Sumner while he was ill as he sought improvement from breathing sea air. He was buried at Addington Cemetery.

Notes

References

1841 births
People from Wishaw
1891 deaths
Scottish emigrants to New Zealand
Members of the New Zealand House of Representatives
New Zealand builders
New Zealand MPs for Christchurch electorates
Burials at Addington Cemetery, Christchurch
Independent MPs of New Zealand
Unsuccessful candidates in the 1887 New Zealand general election
19th-century New Zealand politicians
Christchurch City Councillors